Kayrakty (Qairaqty), until 2007 Borodinovka, (Borodinovka) is an aul (a rural locality) in Kargaly District, Aktobe Region, Kazakhstan. Population:

References

Aktobe Region
Populated places in Kazakhstan